Loans to sons in potestate were subject to various kinds of fraud, and the senatus consultum Macedonianum, passed during the time of Vespasian, prevented creditors from suing on most such loans.
Note potestate means power in Latin.

See also
Roman law
List of Roman laws

References

Roman law